The 1998 Calgary Stampeders season was the 41st season for the team in the Canadian Football League and their 64th overall. The Stampeders finished first in the West Division for the seventh time in nine seasons with a 12–6 record. The Stampeders defeated the Edmonton Eskimos in the West Final and then beat the Hamilton Tiger-Cats in the 86th Grey Cup in the first Grey Cup matchup between those two teams. Wally Buono completed his seventh season as the team's head coach and fifth as the general manager. It was the fourth Grey Cup victory in Stampeders history and Buono became the first head coach to win multiple Grey Cup championships for the franchise.

Offseason
The 1998 CFL Draft took place on April 7, 1998. The Stampeders had six selections in the six-round draft.

CFL Draft

Preseason

Schedule

Regular season

Season Standings

Season schedule

Awards and records
Jeff Nicklin Memorial Trophy – Kelvin Anderson (RB)

1998 CFL All-Stars
QB – Jeff Garcia
RB – Kelvin Anderson
SB – Allen Pitts
WR – Terry Vaughn
OG – Fred Childress
LB – Alondra Johnson
P – Tony Martino

Western All-Star Selections
QB – Jeff Garcia
RB – Kelvin Anderson
SB – Allen Pitts
SB – Vince Danielsen
WR – Terry Vaughn
C – Jamie Crysdale
OG – Fred Childress
LB – Darryl Hall
LB – Alondra Johnson
CB – Marvin Coleman
DB – Jack Kellogg
P – Tony Martino
ST – Marvin Coleman

Post-season

Schedule

Grey Cup

References

Calgary Stampeders seasons
N. J. Taylor Trophy championship seasons
Grey Cup championship seasons
Calg